Belgian Bowl XX featured the West Flanders Tribes and the Brussels Black Angels in an American football game to decide the Belgian Football League (BFL) champion for the 2007 season. The Tribes won their 2nd Belgian Bowl in a row.

Play Offs
The 2 teams that play in the Belgian Bowl are the winners of the Belgian Bowl playoffs.

References

External links
Official Belgian Bowl website

American football in Belgium
Belgian Bowl
Belgian Bowl